Tendo-ryu may refer to:

 Tendo-ryu bujutsu, a bujutsu koryu specializing in the use of the naginata
 Tendo-ryu Aikido, an aikido style founded by Kenji Shimizu
 The style of "Anything-Goes Martial Arts", practiced by the Tendo family in the anime/manga series Ranma ½

See also
 
 
 Tendō (disambiguation)
 Ryu (disambiguation)